Girk may refer to:
 The village of Kirk in Azerbaijan, also known as Girk.
 A G protein-coupled inwardly-rectifying potassium channel, abbreviated as GIRK.